Ault may refer to:

People
Chris Ault, head coach for the Nevada Wolf Pack football team
Dick Ault, American athlete
John Ault, writer, academic, politician
Doug Ault, Major League Baseball player
E.B. "Harry" Ault, American labor union newspaper editor
George Ault, American painter
James Percy Ault (1881–1929), American geophysicist, oceanographer, and captain of a research vessel
Levi Addison Ault, businessman and bureaucrat
Marie Ault, British actress
Samuel Ault, Ontario political figure
William Ault (1842 - after 1922) English potter
William B. Ault, US naval aviation officer

Places
Ault, Colorado
Ault, Northern Ireland
Ault Hucknall, a small village in Derbyshire, England
Ault Park (Ontario), Ontario, Canada
Ault Park, Cincinnati, Ohio, US
Ault, Somme, France
Ault Township, St. Louis County, Minnesota

Other
USS Ault (DD-698)
"Ault Pottery" and "Ault Faience", see William Ault

See also
Auld (disambiguation)